The House of Hoyos is a Spanish and Austrian noble family. It 
derives its name from El Hoyo de Pinares in Ávila, Castile and León, and can be traced to the 9th century.

Juan de Hoyos and his family accompanied the later Ferdinand I, Holy Roman Emperor, to Lower Austria in 1525, founding the Austrian branch of the family. This branch rose to prominence in Austria and in Hungary as Hungarian magnates over the centuries.

The older line of the family was elevated to imperial counts in 1628, and became extinct in 1718. A younger line was elevated to imperial counts in 1674.

Notable members
Ernst Karl von Hoyos-Sprinzenstein (1830–1903), Austrian landowner and politician
Alexander, Count of Hoyos (1876-1937), Austro-Hungarian diplomat
Marguerite, Countess of Hoyos (1871–1945), sister of Alexander; married Herbert, Prince of Bismarck (1849-1904) and became Princess of Bismarck
Melanie, Countess of Hoyos (1916–1949), daughter of Alexander; married her cousin Gottfried, Count von Bismarck-Schönhausen (1901-1949) and became Countess von Bismarck-Schönhausen
Marie Antoinette, Countess of Hoyos (1920–2004), married Prince Wilhem Victor of Prussia (1919–1989), son of Prince Adalbert of Prussia
Ladislas de Hoyos Count of Hoyos (1939-2011), French TV journalist
 Douglas Hoyos-Trauttmansdorff (1990), Austrian politician

Literature 
 Genealogisches Handbuch des Adels, Adelslexikon Band VI, Band 91 der Gesamtreihe, S. 389–390, C. A. Starke Verlag, Limburg (Lahn) 1987, ISSN|0435-2408.
 Michael S. Habsburg-Lothringen: Die Familie Hoyos. Geschichte und Persönlichkeiten. In: Herbert Knittler (ed.): Adel im Wandel. Politik, Kultur, Konfession 1500–1700, Katalog der Niederösterreichischen Landesausstellung Rosenburg 1990. Wien 1990, S. 565–576.

Spanish noble families
Hungarian nobility
Austrian noble families
Counts of the Holy Roman Empire
Families of Spanish ancestry